The 2017 AIB GAA Football Ulster Senior Club Championship was the 50th instalment of the annual competition organised by Ulster GAA. It was one of the four provincial competitions of the 2017–18 All-Ireland Senior Club Football Championship.

Slaughtneil from Derry were the defending champions, having beaten Kilcoo from Down in the 2016 final.

Slaughtneil successfully defended their title after defeating Cavan champions Cavan Gaels to claim their third title in four years.

Teams
The Ulster championship is contested by the winners of the nine county championships in the Irish province of Ulster. Ulster comprises the six counties of Northern Ireland, as well as Cavan, Donegal and Monaghan in the Republic of Ireland.

Bracket

Preliminary round

Quarter-finals

Semi-finals

Final

Championship statistics

Top scorers
Overall

In a single game

References

Ulster Senior Club Championship
Ulster Senior Club Football Championship
2017 in Northern Ireland sport